Kandis (Mandailing Batak: ᯄ᯦ᯊᯚ᯲) was an ancient Minangkabau kingdom based in the western-central region of Sumatra island, which is part of the modern-day Indonesian regions of West Sumatra, Jambi, and Riau. 

The kingdom of Kandis is estimated to have been established since  1st century BC, believed to be the oldest Minangkabau kingdom in Sumatra, as well as the Indonesian Archipelago in general. In the 13th century AD, the area of where Kandis Kingdom located is still remain known as Kandis, it is mentioned as one of the Majapahit territories in an Old Javanese literary work of  written in 1365 by Prapanca.

References

History of Sumatra
History of Indonesia
Precolonial states of Indonesia